Socrate Sidiropoulos (born 1947 in Attica, Greece), is a Greek painter and sculptor.

Biography

His mother painter of orthodox icons taught him the drawing, iconography, fresco and mosaic.

He had painted icons for Gregorian and Julian orthodox churches.

He was disciple of the sculptor Ossip Zadkine.

He continued to study the sculpture by the sculptor Costas Valsamis.

He learned the western painting by the painters Zoe Valsamis and Philopoemen Constantinidi or Caracosta.

He completed his studies at the Academie de la Grande Chaumière in Paris.

He painted portraits, for example the portrait of the matador Manolete, Nimeño II, Paquirri and others.

Influenced from the painters Goya, Zurbarán, and Caravaggio.

He had painted religious scenes with occidental art.

He had painted many scenes of  Flamenco and Bullfighting.

Creations

Among His Creations I quote a few:

Painting, The Artist and his Room, Museum of  Elsene, Bruxelles, Belgium.
Painting, Oriental Portrait, Göteborgs  Konstmuseum, Göteborgs, Sweden.
Painting, Manolete, Museo de Arte de El Salvador.
Painting, Suleiman the Magnificent, The Pushkin State Museum of Fine Arts of Moscow, Russia.
Painting, La Vuelta (Nimeno II), Nouveau Musée National de Monaco, Les Villas des Pins, Monaco.

and others.

Bibliography

Martine Brimault, Peintres de Portraits à Paris de 1764 à 2014, Erato 2014, page 131, 132, 133, 134, BNF Bibliothèque Nationale de France, Paris, France. BNF Catalogue Général
Martine Brimault, Sotiris René Sidiropoulos, Peintre Sculpteur, monographie de l'artiste, Erato 2014, page 76, 77, 78, 79, BNF Bibliothèque Nationale de France, Paris, France. BNF Catalogue Général

External links
 DEN STORE DANSKE Gyldendals åbne Encyklopædi, København, Danmark.
Gran Enciclopèdia Catalana, Barcelona, Espanya.

Greek painters
1947 births
People from Attica
Greek sculptors
Living people